The 1991 James Hardie 12 Hour was an endurance race for production cars staged at the Mount Panorama Circuit, Bathurst, New South Wales, Australia, on 31 March 1991. It was the first "Bathurst 12 Hour". Of the 24 starters, 20 were classified as finishers.

The race was won by Allan Grice, Peter Fitzgerald and  Nigel Arkell driving a Toyota Supra.

Classes
The race was open to "Group E" cars (officially Group 3E Series Production Cars) and other production cars.

Cars competed in the following classes:
Class A : Touring cars under 1600 cc
Class B : Touring cars 1601 - 2500 cc
Class C : Touring cars 2501 - 4000 cc
Class D : Touring cars over 4000 cc
Class S : Sports cars under 2200 cc
Class T : Turbocharged cars

Results

 Fastest lap: Peter Fitzgerald (Toyota Supra Turbo), 2:42.83 (137.36 km/h) on lap 225.

References

Further reading
 Australian Motor Racing Year, 1991/1992
 Sydney Morning Herald, 1 April 1991

External links
 1991 BATHURST 12 HOUR RACE '2 Hours To Go', www.youtube.com

Motorsport in Bathurst, New South Wales
James Hardie 12 Hour
Bathurst